Jinvani Channel is an Indian television channel solely dedicated to the Digambara  group of
Jainism. It was launched on 9 December 2011 under the aegis of Jain Telemedia Services Ltd of the parent company Sea TV Network LTd.

Shows
Aahar Charya
Aalochna Path
Aaradhna
ABCD Of Jainism
Dharmyatra
Healthy Living
Jain Focus
Jain Jyotish(Live Call Show)
Janm Jayanti Programme
Jigyasa Samadhan
Jin Bhakti
Jinvani Vandna
Kaavyanjali
Mangal Aarti
Santvani (Amit Sagar Ji Maharaj)

References

See also 
Airtel digital TV

Religious television channels in India
Jain mass media